Hard Labor Creek Observatory  is an astronomical observatory owned and operated by Georgia State University in the United States.  It is located within Hard Labor Creek State Park, 50 miles east of the Atlanta, Georgia campus.

Visiting the Observatory 
The observatory is open to the public one evening per month during the spring, summer, fall, and winter months.  These events are free and are staffed by astronomers from the Department of Physics and Astronomy at Georgia State University.  Potential visitors are advised that open houses are subject to cancellation due to inclement weather, and parking is limited so carpooling is highly encouraged.  The current open house schedule can be found at GSU Astronomy Open House Schedule.

See also 
List of observatories

References

External links
 Hard Labor Creek Observatory Clear Sky Clock Forecasts of observing conditions.

Astronomical observatories in Georgia (U.S. state)
Buildings and structures in Morgan County, Georgia
Education in Morgan County, Georgia
Tourist attractions in Morgan County, Georgia